The Torre Guinigi  is a tower in Lucca, Tuscany, central Italy. It is a typical example of local Romanesque-Gothic architecture. The height of the tower is 45 meters with a total of 233 steps to reach the top.

The tower dates from the 1300s, when a number of wealthy families were building bell towers within the walls of Lucca as status symbols. It is one of the few remaining towers within the walls. It is known for the tall trees (holm oaks) growing on top of the tower - The kitchen was originally on the floor below with the rooftop serving as a kitchen garden.  

The tower was donated to the local government by the descendants of the Guinigi family.

External links
Palazzo e Torre Guinigi (travelitalia.com)

Guinigi
Palaces in Lucca
Tourist attractions in Tuscany
Romanesque architecture in Lucca